|}

This is a list of electoral district results of the 1956 Western Australian election.

Results by Electoral district

Albany

Avon Valley

Beeloo

Blackwood

Boulder

Bunbury

Canning

Claremont

Collie 

 Two party preferred vote was estimated.

Cottesloe

Dale

Darling Range

East Perth

Eyre

Fremantle

Gascoyne

Geraldton 

 Two party preferred vote was estimated.

Greenough

Guildford-Midland

Harvey

Kalgoorlie

Katanning

Kimberley

Leederville

Maylands 

 Two party preferred vote was estimated.

Melville

Merredin-Yilgarn 

 Two party preferred vote was estimated.

Middle Swan

Moore

Mount Hawthorn

Mount Lawley

Mount Marshall

Murchison

Murray

Narrogin

Nedlands

North Perth

Northam

Pilbara

Roe

South Fremantle

South Perth

Stirling

Subiaco

Toodyay

Vasse

Victoria Park

Warren

Wembley Beaches

West Perth

See also 

 1956 Western Australian state election
 Candidates of the 1956 Western Australian state election
 Members of the Western Australian Legislative Assembly, 1956–1959

References 

Results of Western Australian elections
1956 elections in Australia